The Dr. Lawrence Branch Young House is a historic home located in Rolesville, North Carolina, a satellite town of the state capital Raleigh. Built in 1903, the Young house is the only example of Queen Anne and Colonial Revival architecture in Rolesville. The two-story white house features a wraparound porch, tall brick chimneys, and steep pyramidal roofs.

In September 2003, the Dr. Lawrence Branch Young House was listed on the National Register of Historic Places.

See also
 List of Registered Historic Places in North Carolina

References

Houses on the National Register of Historic Places in North Carolina
Houses completed in 1903
Queen Anne architecture in North Carolina
Colonial Revival architecture in North Carolina
Houses in Wake County, North Carolina
National Register of Historic Places in Wake County, North Carolina